Mascara Airfield is an abandoned military airfield and later civilian airport in Algeria, located in the southwestern suburbs of Mascara.

During World War II it was used by the United States Army Air Force Twelfth Air Force during the North African Campaign against the German Afrika Korps.

References

 Maurer, Maurer. Air Force Combat Units of World War II. Maxwell AFB, Alabama: Office of Air Force History, 1983. .

External links

Airfields of the United States Army Air Forces in Algeria
Airports established in 1942
1942 establishments in Algeria